Reinhard Meyer zu Bentrup (born 22 May 1939) is a German farmer and politician. He was born in Gadderbaum-Bielefeld.

Life 
Meyer zu Bentrup is a farmer. He has a farm in Brönninghausen-Bielefeld. At the universities in Berlin and in Bonn he studied agriculture. He is a member of the party CDU. From 1976 to 1994 Meyer zu Bentrup was a member of the German Bundestag. He is married.

Awards 
 1988: Order of Merit of the Federal Republic of Germany

References

External links 

 Official website of farm Meyer zu Bentrup
 Bielefeld: Hof Meyer zu Bentrup

1939 births
Living people
People from Bielefeld
Politicians from Bielefeld
Recipients of the Order of Merit of the Federal Republic of Germany
Christian Democratic Union of Germany politicians
Members of the Bundestag for the Christian Democratic Union of Germany
Members of the Bundestag 1976–1980
Members of the Bundestag 1980–1983
Members of the Bundestag 1983–1987
Members of the Bundestag 1987–1990
Members of the Bundestag 1990–1994
Members of the Bundestag 1994–1998
20th-century German politicians
German farmers